Showkutally Soodhun is a politician from Mauritius who served as Vice Prime Minister of Mauritius from 17 December 2014 to 16 November 2017 and Minister of Housing and Lands.

References 

Vice Prime Ministers of Mauritius
Mauritian politicians